The Revells of Christendome is an engraving by English engraver Thomas Cockson. With image size of 21.6 x 35.5 cm and overall measure of 29.2 x 37.2 cm, A copy is in the collection of the Department of Prints and Drawings of the British Museum.

Description
In this satirical print, which ridicules the political condition in Europe and the efforts of England and France to negotiate cessation of hostilities between Spain and the Dutch Republic shortly after the Twelve Years' Truce, James I of England, Henri IV of France, Christian IV of Denmark and Maurice of Nassau are seen playing several gambling games such as backgammon, the card game Maw, and dice. They are accompanied by three friars and a dog which urinates on the foot of one of them, while the pope and a cleric are somewhat trying to cheat James I and his fellow European comrades.

Original text

References

External links
Catalogue of prints and drawings in the British Museum: Division I. Political and personal satires (81) at Internet Archive

1609 drawings
Prints and drawings in the British Museum
Renaissance prints
17th-century engravings
Cultural depictions of James VI and I
Cultural depictions of Dutch kings
Cultural depictions of Christian IV of Denmark
Cultural depictions of French kings